Lenthall may refer to:

Lenthall Houses, historic houses on the George Washington University campus in Washington, D.C.
Lenthalls Dam, a dam in Queensland, Australia
, a United States Navy fleet replenishment oiler in service since 1987

People with the surname
John Lenthall (shipbuilder) (1807-1882), American naval architect and shipbuilder
Sir John Lenthall, 1st Baronet (1624/5–1681), English lawyer and member of parliament
William Lenthall (1591-1662), English politician who served as Speaker of the House of Commons

See also